Mason Valley is a valley in San Diego County, California. Mason Valley was named after a settler, James E. Mason who established a ranch in the valley in the later 19th century.

References

 	

Valleys of San Diego County, California
East County (San Diego County)